Forward Croatia - Progressive Alliance was a centre-left political party founded by former Croatian President Ivo Josipović.

History 
Party's founding congress was held on 31 May 2015 in Zagreb.

Some of the most prominent party members were a professor at Zagreb Faculty of Law Josip Kregar, professor at the Zagreb Faculty of Economics Velimir Srića, opera singer Dunja Vejzović, film and TV director Irena Škorić, attorney Anto Nobilo, and former Minister of Veterans Ivica Pančić.

Ahead of 2015 parliamentary elections the party formed a coalition called Successful Croatia with liberal People's Party - Reformists.

On 11 April 2019, the party joined into the SDP.

Electoral history

References

2015 establishments in Croatia
2019 disestablishments in Croatia
Political parties established in 2015
Political parties disestablished in 2019
Social democratic parties in Croatia